Fair Oaks is an unincorporated community in Union Township, Jasper County, Indiana.

History
Fair Oaks was made a station on the railroad built through that territory in the early 1880s. The Fair Oaks post office was established in 1884.

Geography

As of 2013, Fair Oaks Farms in Fair Oaks features a working Rotolactor that is open to the public as a part of its "Dairy Adventure" tour.

References

Unincorporated communities in Jasper County, Indiana
Unincorporated communities in Indiana